Ssss is the debut studio album by English electronic music duo VCMG. It was released in 2012 by Mute Records.

Critical reception
The Guardian wrote that "the analogue synths and electronic squelches could have boomed out of a darkened club at any time in the last two decades, but repeated listens reveal expertise with a sense of fun." The Quietus wrote that "not least of its triumphs is that – without context, without history – it is simply fantastic music to dance to."

Track listing

Personnel
Credits adapted from the liner notes of the booklet of Ssss.

 Martin L. Gore – programming, production
 Vince Clarke – programming, production
 Sie Medway-Smith – recording, engineering
 Timothy "Q" Wiles – mixing
 Stefan Betkbat – mastering
 Jan L. Trigg – illustrations
 Paula A. Taylor – design
 Travis Shinn & David Wade – studio photography

Charts

References

2012 debut albums
Mute Records albums